This list provides the list of various educational institutions in municipality of Saptari District, Nepal i.e. Kanchan Rup.

Kanchan Rup is home to several educational institutions for pre-primary, primary, lower secondary, secondary, higher secondary and college studies.

Colleges
Annapurna Multiple Campus, Kanchanpur-Barrier
Sungava Multiple Campus, Kanchanpur-saptari
National People College, Kanchanpur
Rupnagar Multiple Campus=

Higher Secondary School
Balabodh Higher Secondary English Boarding School, Kanchanpur-Barrier
Shree Mahendra Janta Higher Secondary School, Baluwa, Kathmandu|Baluwa
Shree Sarvodaya Higher Secondary School, Kanchanpur
Shree Shankar Higher Secondary School, Rupnagar

Secondary school
Children Model School, Kanchanpur Barrier
Daffodil Secondary English School, Kanchanpur
Little Flower English Boarding School, Rupnagar
International Lucky English School, Kanchanpur
Motherland English Boarding School, Kanchanpur Hatiya
Peace Angel's English School, Kanchanpur
Rajaji Janjagaran English Boarding School, Maleth
RD Memorial English Boarding School, Rupnagar
Shree Bhrikuti Secondary School, Aadarsha Tol, Bandara
Shree Shankar Secondary School, Subba Tol, Barmajhiya

Lower Secondary School
Balabodh English Boarding School
Lotus English Academy, Barmajhiya
Sunakhari English Academy Boarding School
Sagarmatha Public School, Baramjhiya
Shree Shiva English Boarding School, Baramjhiya

Primary school

Geeta Gyan Kunj English School, Baramjhiya
Rose Hill English Boarding School, Baluwa
Sharda International Boarding School, Kanchanpur
Shree Bhagwati Rastriya Primary School, Ladhbedahi
Shree Rastriya Primary School, Ghoghanpur, Sitapur
Damber Devi Bhagawati Primary School, Bengri

Pre-primary Schools
Suryodaya English Montessary Boarding School, Baluwa

References

External links
http://www.edu.org.np/list-of-educatinal-institutions-in-Nepal

Saptari District
Kanchan Rup